Pearl Ondaatje was a pioneer of  Radio Ceylon, the oldest radio station in South Asia. She was one of the radio station's first female newsreaders and a presenter of radio programs, including programs for women listeners of the radio station.

Pearl Ondaatje worked very closely with the Australian administrator Clifford Dodd and Livy Wijemanne in shaping the new Commercial Service of Radio Ceylon in the 1950s in Colombo. Millions of listeners across South Asia tuned into the hear the voices of announcers such as Pearl Ondaatje. Radio Ceylon ruled the airwaves of the Indian sub-continent in the 1950s and 1960s.

She is a relative of the Canadian philanthropist, Sir Christopher Ondaatje and his brother, the award-winning author Michael Ondaatje, who were both born in Ceylon.

See also
Radio Ceylon
Sri Lanka Broadcasting Corporation

External links 
Sri Lanka Broadcasting Corporation
Sir Christopher Ondaatje
Michael Ondaatje
 SLBC-creating new waves of history
Eighty Years of Broadcasting in Sri Lanka

Sri Lankan radio journalists
P